The Pentax Optio S50 is a digital compact camera announced by Pentax on August 16, 2004. It contains an early example of a selective colour filter.

References
http://www.dpreview.com/products/pentax/compacts/pentax_optios50/specifications

Pentax cameras
Cameras introduced in 2004